This is a list of the Croatia national football team results from 2010 to 2019.

Croatia missed out on the 2010 FIFA World Cup, but then qualified for UEFA Euro 2012, the 2014 FIFA World Cup, and UEFA Euro 2016, making it to the second round in the latter. Then, at the 2018 FIFA World Cup, the team achieved the best result in its history: it finished second and won the silver medal as it reached the final and lost to France.

Afterwards, Croatia entered League A of the inaugural 2018–19 edition of the UEFA Nations League. Based on its final ranking the team would have been relegated to League B, but a revamp of the competition's format meant it remained in League A for the following season. At the end of the decade, Croatia qualified for UEFA Euro 2020.

Key 

As per statistical convention in football, matches decided in extra time are counted as wins and losses, while matches decided by penalty shoot-outs are counted as draws.

By year

2010

2011

2012

2013

2014

2015

2016

2017

2018

2019

Record per opponent

External links 

 Croatia at FIFA.com
 Croatian Football Statistics

2010s in Croatia
2010-19